Thamm is the name of:

 Alexander Thamm (born 1983), German footballer
 Hans Thamm (1921–2007), German choral conductor
 Sylvia Anderson (née Thamm, 1927–2016), British voice artist and film producer
 Werner Thamm (born 1926), German footballer
 Vera Thamm, Paralympic swimmer

Surnames from given names